Mario von Appen (sometimes listed as Mario Von Appen or Mario van Appen, born 31 July 1965 in Hamburg) is a German sprint canoeist who competed from the late 1980s to the mid-1990s. At the 1992 Summer Olympics in Barcelona, he won a gold medal in the K-4 1000 m event.

Von Appen also won six medals at the ICF Canoe Sprint World Championships with two golds (K-4 1000 m and K-4 10000 m: both 1993), three silvers (K-4 500 m: 1989, 1993, 1995), and a bronze (K-4 1000 m: 1994).

References

External links
 
 

1965 births
Canoeists at the 1992 Summer Olympics
German male canoeists
Living people
Olympic canoeists of Germany
Olympic gold medalists for Germany
Olympic medalists in canoeing
ICF Canoe Sprint World Championships medalists in kayak
Medalists at the 1992 Summer Olympics